In mathematics, the plus construction is a method for simplifying the fundamental group of a space without changing its homology and cohomology groups. 

Given a perfect normal subgroup of the fundamental group of a connected CW complex , attach two-cells along loops in  whose images in the fundamental group generate the subgroup. This operation generally changes the homology of the space, but these changes can be reversed by the addition of three-cells.

The most common application of the plus construction is in algebraic K-theory. The direct limit of these groups via these maps is denoted  and its classifying space is denoted .

See also
 Semi-s-cobordism

References

.
.
.

External links

Algebraic topology
Homotopy theory